Yorke Peninsula is  a peninsula in South Australia.

Yorke Peninsula may refer to:

District Council of Yorke Peninsula (1888–1969), a former local government area
Electoral district of Yorke Peninsula, a former electorate
Yorke Peninsula Council, a local government area 
Yorke Peninsula Country Times, a newspaper
Yorke Peninsula Football League, an Australian rules football league

See also

York (disambiguation)